Leroy Smart (born 1952), is a reggae singer-songwriter and record producer from Kingston, Jamaica.

Biography
Smart was born in 1952 and orphaned at the age of two. He was raised at Maxfield Park Children's Home and educated at Alpha Boys School, where he studied singing, drums, and dancing. 

Smart recorded his first single, "It Pains Me", in 1969 for a producer called Mr. Caribbean.   In 1970, he recorded "Ethiopia" for Joe Gibbs and the first version of one of his most famous songs, "Pride & Ambition", with producer Gussie Clarke. His breakthrough would come in 1973 with "Mother Liza", produced by Jimmy Radway, which topped the local singles chart, and led to "Pride & Ambition" also becoming a big local hit. After working with Bunny Lee for several years, he recorded another of his best-known songs, "Ballistic Affair" at Channel One, in 1976, and began producing himself in 1977.  Smart has continued recording and remains popular, with over 35 albums to his name. He is regarded as one of Jamaica's most outrageous and colourful characters.

Smart appeared in the film Rockers along with contemporaries such as Gregory Isaacs and Jacob Miller.

Albums
 Ballistic Affair (1977) Conflict/Channel One (aka The Very Best of Leroy Smart)
 Dread Hot In Africa (1977) Burning Sounds
 Impressions of Leroy Smart (1977) Burning Sounds
 Superstar (1977) Third World/Jackpot
 In London Clinker (1978) Attack
 Jah Loves Everyone (1978) Burning Sounds
 Propaganda (1978) Burning Rockers/Burning Sounds
 Let Everyman Survive (1979) GG's
 Showcase Rub A Dub (1979) GG's
 Disco Showcase (1979) Gussie
 Harder Than The Rest (197?) Tad's
 Reggae Showcase Vol 1 (197?) Imperial
 Too Much Grudgefulness (1981) Jah Life
 She Just a Draw Card (1982) Worldwide Success
 On Top (1983) Live & Learn
 She Love It In The Morning (1983) GG's
 Style and Fashion (1983) Nura
 Exclusive (1984) Dynamite
 Live Up Roots Children (1984) Sunset
 Rockers Award Winners (1985) Greensleeves (with Sugar Minott)
 Back To Back (1985) Volcano (with Junior Reid)
 Bank Account (1985) Powerhouse
 Showcase (1985) Fatman
 We Rule Everytime (1985) Jammy's
 Face To Face Clash (1985) Sunset (with Junior Reid)
 Prophecy a Go Hold Dem (1986) Jah Life/WWS
 Music in the Dancehall (198?), Zion Music Workshop
 Musical Don (1988) Skengdon
 Don of Class (1988) WWS
 Talk About Friends (1993)
 Let Everyman Survive (1993), Jamaican Gold
 Everytime! (1994), RAS
 Leroy Smart Meets Sister Levi (2003), Budgie Entertainments
 Mr. Smart in Dub (2005), Jamaican Recordings
 Private Message (2005), Grapevine 
 Jah Loves Everyone + Impressions - CD Album double disc 2019 Burning Sounds 
 Propaganda album - 180 gram Vinyl reissue  Burning Sounds 
 Impressions - 180 gram Vinyl reissue 2020  Burning Sounds

References

External links
 Discography at Roots Archives.

Jamaican record producers
1952 births
Living people
Musicians from Kingston, Jamaica
Jamaican reggae musicians